Macouba is a village and commune in the French overseas department of Martinique.

Geography

Climate

Macouba has a tropical rainforest climate (Köppen climate classification Af).

See also
Communes of the Martinique department

References

External links

Communes of Martinique
Populated places in Martinique